Thomas M. "Tom" Amoss (born November 17, 1961, in New Orleans, Louisiana) is a trainer of Thoroughbred race horses.

A graduate of Louisiana State University with a degree in marketing and a member of Sigma Nu Fraternity, Tom Amoss had worked with horses while in high school and after completing his education went to work for trainers Frank Brothers, Larry Robideaux and John Parisella. In 1987 he got his trainer's license and set out on his own. He has won nine leading trainer titles. He won his 4,000th race in 2022 at Saratoga.

Amoss has also served as racing analyst for TVG and ESPN sports television.

In 1998, Tom Amoss was inducted into the Fair Grounds Hall of Fame.

In 2019, he won the Kentucky Oaks with Serengeti Empress.

Amoss was awarded in December 2020 with the Big Sport of Turfdom Award, which recognizes individuals or groups who enhance coverage of thoroughbred racing through cooperation with the media and racing publicists.

References

External links 
kentuckyderby.com

1961 births
Living people
Louisiana State University alumni
American horse trainers
American horse racing commentators
Sportspeople from New Orleans